Roland Aaro Bob van den Bos (born 19 December 1947 in The Hague), known as Bob van den Bos, is a Dutch politician.

References

1947 births
Living people
Democrats 66 MEPs
Democrats 66 politicians
Dutch activists
Dutch columnists
Dutch human rights activists
Dutch non-fiction writers
Dutch political scientists
Dutch political writers
Members of the House of Representatives (Netherlands)
Members of the Senate (Netherlands)
MEPs for the Netherlands 1999–2004
Writers from The Hague